The Flag Officer, Second Flotilla was a senior British Royal Navy appointment from 1971 to 1992.

History
After the creation of the single Commander-in-Chief Fleet post in 1971, its subordinate commands were reorganised. Three major sub-commands were created; the First Flotilla, Second Flotilla and Carriers and Amphibious Ships each commanded by a rear admiral. 
The Flotilla included (Watson & Smith 2015):
4th Frigate Squadron (1976-1981)
5th Frigate Squadron (1972-1976)
6th Frigate Squadron (1972-1976)
7th Frigate Squadron (1972-1980)
8th Frigate Squadron (1972-1980)
5th Destroyer Squadron (1980-1992)

In 1990 the First Flotilla was re-designated Surface Flotilla. Rear Admiral Brigstocke, the incumbent Flag Officer Second Flotilla, commanded the  task group off Libya during the Gulf War.

In April 1992, the system was changed when the Third Flotilla was abolished and the remaining two flotilla commanders became Flag Officer, Surface Flotilla - responsible for operational readiness and training; and Second Flotilla became Flag Officer, UK Task Group, who would command any deployed task group.

Flag Officers, Second Flotilla 

Included:
 Rear-Admiral David Williams: November 1971-March 1972 
 Rear-Admiral Andrew J. Miller: March 1972-March 1973 
 Rear-Admiral Richard P. Clayton: March 1973-December 1974 
 Rear-Admiral John D.E. Fieldhouse: December 1974-October 1976 
 Rear-Admiral William D.M. Staveley: October 1976-March 1977 
 Rear-Admiral Martin La T. Wemyss: March 1977-December 1978 
 Rear-Admiral Peter M. Stanford: December 1978-October 1980 
 Rear-Admiral Nicholas J.S. Hunt: October 1980-November 1981
 Rear-Admiral Robert W. F. Gerken: November 1981-October 1983 
 Rear-Admiral D. Benjamin Bathurst: October 1983-April 1985 
 Rear-Admiral W. Richard S. Thomas: April 1985-December 1986 
 Rear-Admiral Guy F. Liardet: December 1986-March 1988 
 Rear-Admiral A. Peter Woodhead: March 1988-August 1989 
 Rear-Admiral Peter C. Abbott: August 1989-January 1991  
 Rear-Admiral John R. Brigstocke: January 1991-April 1992

Notes

References 
 Mackie, Colin. (2018) "Royal Navy Senior Appointments from 1865" (PDF). gulabin.com. Colin Mackie. Scotland, UK.
 Roberts, John (2009). Safeguarding the Nation: The Story of the Modern Royal Navy. Barnsley, England: Seaforth Publishing. .
 

 

S
Royal Navy flotillas
Military units and formations established in 1971
Military units and formations disestablished in 1992